The National Hockey League presents numerous annual awards and trophies to recognize its teams and players.  The oldest, and most recognizable, is the Stanley Cup.  First awarded in 1893, the Stanley Cup is awarded to the NHL's playoff champion.  The Stanley Cup is the third trophy to be used as the league's championship, as for the first nine years of the NHL's existence, it remained a multi-league challenge cup.

Most of the trophies and all-star selections are presented at an annual awards ceremony held in late June after the conclusion of the Stanley Cup playoffs. The awards for the 2019–20 season were handed out during the last two rounds of the playoffs.

History

Team trophies
The NHL's first championship trophy was the O'Brien Cup, which was created by the National Hockey Association in 1910 and transferred to the NHL in 1918, after which it was awarded to the playoff champion until 1927. Following the demise of the Western Hockey League after the 1926 season, the Stanley Cup became exclusive to the NHL, and the O'Brien Trophy became the Trophy awarded to the Canadian Division champion. After the 1938 season, the league reverted to one division, and the O'Brien Trophy was awarded to the Stanley Cup runners-up, until it was retired in 1950.

The  Prince of Wales Trophy was introduced in 1925 as an award for the NHL's playoff champion (alongside the O'Brien Trophy). It soon became the American Division trophy following the 1927–28 season, until the 1937–38 season, when the league reverted to one division. It then became the award for best regular season record, before becoming the East Division trophy in 1967–68. The Prince of Wales Trophy remains an active award. It is awarded to the playoff champion of the Eastern Conference.

The Clarence S. Campbell Bowl was created in 1967 to serve as the Western Division counterpart to the Prince of Wales Trophy. It is now awarded to the Western Conference champion.

The youngest team trophy is the Presidents' Trophy. It has been awarded to the NHL's regular season champion since 1986.

Individual trophies
The first individual trophy was the Hart Trophy, first awarded in 1924 to the league's most valuable player. This trophy was replaced by the current Hart Memorial Trophy in 1960 when the original Hart trophy became too unwieldy.  The Lady Byng Trophy followed in 1925, a year later, awarded to the most gentlemanly player in the league.  Two years later, the Vezina Trophy was created for the NHL's top goaltender.  The Conn Smythe Trophy was first awarded to the NHL's playoff most valuable player in 1965.  Presently, the NHL has 18 annual individual trophies and awards, the most recently created being the Jim Gregory General Manager of the Year Award which was inaugurated in 2010.

Out of the original individual NHL trophies that were awarded prior to expansion (which would be followed by the creation of more individual awards), several players are tied with three awards in the same season. Stan Mikita won the Hart, Art Ross, and Lady Byng trophies, doing so consecutively in the 1966–67 and 1967–68 seasons. Guy Lafleur and Wayne Gretzky have each won the Art Ross, Hart, and Conn Smythe trophies, as well as the Cup, in 1976-77 and 1984–85, respectively. Bobby Orr won the Hart, Norris, and Conn Smythe trophies, along with the Stanley Cup, in 1969–70 and 1971-72. In 1970, Orr also won the Art Ross which makes him the only player to capture four original NHL awards in a single season (Orr also earned a NHL First Team selection, and the only honor which he was eligible for but did not win was the Lady Byng due to his physical style of play).

In addition, the First and second All-Star teams have been named since the 1930–31 NHL season to honor the best performers over the season at each position, as well as the NHL All-Rookie Team from 1983 onwards.

Some of these individual trophies are automatically awarded to players based on their statistics during the regular season, most notably the Art Ross Trophy, Richard Trophy and Jennings Trophy. Other individual trophies are voted on by the Professional Hockey Writers' Association or the team general managers.

Team trophies

Individual trophies and awards

The league has also given some ephemeral awards over the years, including:
NHL/Sheraton Road Performer Award – awarded to the player who accrued the most road points during the regular season.  It was awarded to Joe Sakic of the Colorado Avalanche in 2004 and not subsequently.
Scotiabank/NHL Fan Fav Award – awarded to a National Hockey League player based on fan voting.  It was awarded to Roberto Luongo of the Vancouver Canucks in 2010 and not subsequently.
NHL Lifetime Achievement Award – awarded to a National Hockey League veteran in recognition of their overall contributions to the league and sport. It has been awarded twice, first to Gordie Howe in 2008 and then to Jean Béliveau in 2009.

See also

Lester Patrick Trophy - presented, in part by the NHL, for contributions to hockey in the United States, but not considered an NHL award
Best NHL Player ESPY Award - presented by the American sports television network ESPN to NHL players
Hockey Hall of Fame
Sports Illustrated NHL All-Decade Team (2009)
 NHL All-Rookie Team
 NHL All-Star team

References

External links
NHL trophies at nhl.com
NHL trophies at legendsofhockey.net

Awards
Lifetime achievement awards